Vriesea ospinae is a plant species in the genus Vriesea. It is endemic to Colombia. Two varieties are recognized:

Vriesea ospinae var. gruberi H.Luther
Vriesea ospinae var. ospinae

Cultivars
 Vriesea 'Espirito Santo'

References

ospinae
Endemic flora of Colombia
Plants described in 1983